Sylvia Montero (born 30 June 1985) is a French former professional tennis player.

A right-handed player from Yvelines, Montero won French national titles in junior tennis and was ranked as high as 38 in the world while competing on the ITF Junior Circuit. 

On the professional tour she peaked at 479 in the world, finishing runner-up in two ITF finals. She made a French Open main draw appearance in women's doubles in 2003, as a wildcard pairing with Mathilde Johansson.

ITF finals

Singles: 2 (0–2)

Doubles: 1 (1–0)

References

External links
 
 

1985 births
Living people
French female tennis players
Sportspeople from Yvelines
21st-century French women